Surprised Parties is a 1942 Our Gang short comedy film directed by Edward Cahn and starring George McFarland, Billie Thomas, Mickey Gubitosi, Billy Laughlin, and Janet Burston. It was the 206th Our Gang short (207th episode, 118th talking short, 119th talking episode, and 38th MGM produced episode) that was released.

Plot
Upset because, as a leap year baby (he only has a birthday every four years), Froggy remembers the fact that he has almost never had a birthday party. The gang decides to throw a surprise party in Froggy's honor, but they pretend to throw him out of the clubhouse in order to keep it a secret. Vengefully, Froggy sneaks back and sets all sorts of booby-traps for the other gang members and then shows up at the party disguised as a new girl in town. But when Froggy discovers that the party was for him, he becomes guilty and sets off all the traps by himself.

Cast

The Gang
 Janet Burston as Janet
 Mickey Gubitosi as Mickey
 Billy Laughlin as Froggy Laughlin
 George McFarland as Spanky
 Billie Thomas as Buckwheat

Additional cast
 Margaret Bert as Froggy's mother
 Giovanna Gubitosi as Gloria
 Leon Tyler as Jimmy

Party guests
Buz Buckley, James Gubitosi, Tommy Tucker, Frank Ward

Production note
Surprised Parties was the last short with Edward Cahn as Our Gang'''s regular director. He would return in 1943 to direct Three Smart Guys. Herbert Glazer takes over directing beginning with Doin' Their Bit''.

See also
 Our Gang filmography

References

External links

1942 films
1942 comedy films
American black-and-white films
Films directed by Edward L. Cahn
Metro-Goldwyn-Mayer short films
Our Gang films
1942 short films
1940s American films
1940s English-language films